Laura de Santillana (1955 – 21 October 2019) was an Italian contemporary glass artist.

Early life
de Santillana was born in 1955 in Venice. She studied briefly from 1975 to 1976 at the School of Visual Arts, New York before returning to Italy to work at Venini, a glass company founder by her grandfather Paolo Venini.

Art career
Her work is included in the collections of the Corning Museum of Glass and the Seattle Art Museum.

References

1955 births
2019 deaths
20th-century Italian women artists
21st-century Italian women artists
Italian glass artists